The Bayamón City Cup or Bayamón Cup is an association football annual group stage cup competition run by the Football Federation of Puerto Rico.

History

3rd Bayamon Cup 2013
On February 2, 2013, it was announced the cup received a club from the neighboring island of St. Croix which through the Saint Croix Select Soccer Club, will present in the category of U-15 and U-20 men two teams in the event.

Format
The competition is a group- stage elimination tournament that has been contested by 10 teams since the 2017 edition. This pool consists of the 10 Puerto Rican clubs in the 2 professional leagues, which are Puerto Rico Soccer League, Puerto Rico FC in  the North American Soccer League, and the tournament also includes Puerto Rico college teams and amateur clubs. The first round, consisting of all teams, are played in 2 groups of 5. The top two teams of both groups played in a semifinal round, and a final match to determine the champion. Every match, including the final, is a one-legged tie that lasts 90 minutes plus any additional stoppage time. If no clear winner has been determined after 90 minutes of normal time, 30 minutes of extra time is played. If the score is still level after extra time then the winner is decided by a penalty shoot-out.

Champions

Champions by number of titles

Champions by City

Football competitions in Puerto Rico